The ochre-naped ground tyrant (Muscisaxicola flavinucha) is a species of bird in the family Tyrannidae, the tyrant flycatchers, specifically the ground tyrants.

It is found in Argentina, Bolivia, Chile, and Peru.
Its natural habitats are temperate grassland and subtropical or tropical high-altitude grassland.

The ochre-naped ground tyrant breeds in the Andes from the southern Peru border to the western border of Tierra del Fuego.

References

External links
"Ochre-naped ground tyrant" videos on the Internet Bird Collection
"Ochre-naped ground tyrant" photo gallery VIREO Photo-High Res

ochre-naped ground tyrant
Birds of the Southern Andes
ochre-naped ground tyrant
Taxonomy articles created by Polbot